was a Japanese company established in 1996, and now is one brand (division) of Allied Telesis K.K., that offers networking hardware products.

Overview
Originally, in 1996, Corega Inc. was established by Allied Telesis K.K., headquartered in Yokohama, Kanagawa Japan, for offering networking hardware products for consumer market and small business. 
The company (division) is basically fabless, designing the products, ordering them to the manufactures in Japan, Taiwan and China etc., as Allied Telesis does.
The company (division) offers networking hardware products, network router, network switch and wireless router.
Corega products are sold and installed mostly in Japanese domestic market, but we can find several products at some online shopping, Amazon.com etc..
The business type and scope are same as Green House, Elecom, and  Buffalo, these are mostly consumer market and small business companies in Japan.

In 2009, Allied Telesis K.K. acquired Corega Inc, then it started as one brand (division) in Allied Telesis K.K., as Allied Telesis group restructure.

See also
List of companies of Japan
List of networking hardware vendors

References

External links
 Official Website

Computer companies established in 1996
Electronics companies of Japan
Networking hardware companies
Japanese brands
Japanese companies established in 1996